Syro-Palestinian or Syropalestinian may refer to several things:

 for the region sometimes called Syro-Palestine, see Levant
 for the archaeological field sometimes called Syro-Palestinian, see Levantine archaeology
 for the ancient language sometimes called Syro-Palestinian Aramaic, see Christian Palestinian Aramaic
 for the modern language sometimes called Syro-Palestinian or Syro-Palestinian Arabic, see Levantine Arabic